Ilhéu Gabado is an uninhabited islet in the Gulf of Guinea and is one of the smaller islands of São Tomé and Príncipe. The islet lies 0.4 km off the southwest coast of the island of São Tomé. Due north is another islet, Ilhéu de São Miguel.

References

Uninhabited islands of São Tomé and Príncipe
Lembá District